The Edwin Robert Booth House is a residence located at 94 W. 300 South in Nephi, Utah. Built in 1893, it was listed on the National Register of Historic Places in 1979.

It is a two-story Late Victorian style house.  According to its 1979 National Register nomination:The significance of the Booth House lies in the merit of the architecture. The refined Victorian elegance of this home speaks eloquently of the bourgeois values of the rural entrepreneurial class and the effort they put into making their homes reflect their distance from the less successful participants in the frontier settlement experience. / Edwin Robert Booth Jr. (1857-1914) was the Nephi City Recorder when he married Anna Elizabeth Brough (1860-1931) and built this home. He had been a councilman in Nephi's first city government (1889). In 1899 he was elected mayor of Nephi. During the years following this term of office, he served as the postmaster. Booth's business ventures included executive involvement with the Utah Wool Growers Company and the Nephi National Bank. / This impressive Victorian house was built by a man influential in local politics. His wife was a member of one of the first non-Indian families in the area--her father John had been one of those (as had Edwin's father, Edwin Sr.) who had built within the Salt Creek Fort which had been constructed, beginning in 1854, as a defense against local Indians. Her brothers built homes in the area--James built the home directly south. /  Because of Edwin's civic and business involvements, the Booths entertained extensively. The double parlor in the home was the setting for many parties and dinners--with nieces and nephews pitching in to help."

The house was in deteriorated condition in 1979.  Upon the death of later owner Odell Taylor, "the house was torn apart by relatives looking for money which he had supposedly hidden in the house. It remained unoccupied for many years."  Renovations were planned by the 1979 owners.

References

		
National Register of Historic Places in Juab County, Utah
Victorian architecture in Utah
Houses completed in 1893